China Labor Watch (CLW) is a New York City, New York-based non-government organization founded by labor activist Li Qiang in October 2000. Its mission is the defense of workers' rights in China. Through research, advocacy and legal assistance, CLW seeks to help China's workers become more informed of their rights and more empowered to realize those rights within their communities.

Overview 

Founded in 2000, CLW promotes the rights of workers living in the  People's Republic of China from its offices in New York City and mainland China. To achieve this goal, the organization: 
 Publishes independent investigative reports of factories in China.
 Publicizes news of sub-standard working conditions and wages to the international public.
 Works quietly with multinational corporations who use Chinese suppliers to pressure those firms to conform to international labor standards.
 Empowers the workers themselves to fight for their legal rights.
China Labor Watch has several programs in mainland China to improve local working conditions and promote workers’ legal rights. One of these is the Worker Outreach and Training Program, which provides free classes on Chinese labor law to workers in a neighborhood setting. As a result, the workers become more capable of negotiating with employers and demanding fairer wages and working conditions. Examples of subjects taught in these classes are what to look for in a contract, health dangers in workplaces, and how to bring grievances to the local government's labor departments. By 2007, China Labor Watch had trained over five hundred workers. The organization has distributed forty thousand copies of booklets that explain in clear, accessible terms the hours, wages, and benefits to which workers are entitled by law.

Another program, Hotline Program offers consultancy assistance and legal assistance in terms of labor contracts, social insurance, occupational safety, wages and benefits, and working hours and holidays. China Labor Watch also conducts independent investigations in factories, which cover electronic, retail, footwear, toy, garment, printing, furniture and other manufacturing areas.

Interventions
Often, CLW engages in direct interventions with regard to situations in China. Examples:
2001: Laid off workers from a VTech factory in Guangdong Province received their legally mandated unemployment benefits only after CLW helped take their case to court.
2002: CLW helped workers in the city of Panjin (Liaoning Province) receive their legally owed compensation by releasing a series of press releases.
2004: CLW and other activist organizations successfully campaigned for the release of ten imprisoned Stella International workers by hiring prominent labor lawyers to defend the arrested workers, and by writing advocacy letters asking the companies for which Stella produces to insist on leniency.
2004: CLW began pressing Chinese factory owners to provide injury insurance for their workers. Finally, in 2007, in the wake of these efforts by CLW and other organizations, the Chinese government began to require factories to provide such insurance.
2005: A CLW-funded legal aid program helped about one hundred workers in Shenzhen to receive adequate wages, by training them on how to bring their cases to local labor bureaus. Altogether, the program educated about eight hundred workers on the law and labor issues, and trained ten labor activists to help workers with work injury related issues.
In 2006, CLW helped coordinate ten thousand workers in launching a petition on labor rights protection in Shenzhen.
2006: CLW publicized the fact that fifteen of Wal-Mart’s China-based supplier factories were under violation for underpaying their workers.

Reports
Occasionally, the organization issues its own reports.
Examples:
2007: A survey and case study of 260 injured workers in the Pearl River Delta region was released.
2007: A report about Chinese suppliers to multinational toy corporations was released. The report covered approximately eight toy factories, which are affiliated with Bandai, Chip Jap Co., Ltd., Walt Disney, E. Box and Eager, Fox, Gosh International, Hasbro, Meid Ltd., Russ Berrie, Sanrio, Seeds Co. Ltd, Sega, Takara, and others.
2007: An investigative report was released on four apparel factories in south China whose main customers include Adidas, Bali Intimates, HanesBrands Inc., Piege Co (Felina Lingerie), Quiksilver, Regina Miracle, Speedo, Walcoal America Inc., and Walmart. The report revealed excessive overtime, an extremely exploitive wage system, restrictions on labor associations, and other violations of human rights and Chinese labor laws.
2008: A follow-up investigation on Taiway Sports, Inc., a PUMA supplier in China, found that things were no better than they were in 2005. Payments were still being withheld. Theft and violence still existed. Discrimination based on geographic origin was being practiced.
2008: In this report, China Labor Watch criticized the retailer Walmart for being “hypocritical” in its commitments to social responsibility based on an investigation of one of its shoe supplier factories in China. The investigation found inadequate payment, risky working conditions, and exploitative management system in this factory.
2012: A report detailing the investigation of eight different Samsung factories in China. These investigations uncovered unpaid work, forced overtime, underage workers, abuse, and discrimination.
2013: CLW released a report on three Pegatron factories supplying to Apple which uncovered poor working and living conditions, underage workers, discriminatory hiring, harassment and abuse, fire safety, and more.
2014: CLW released a report a four toy factories which produce goods for Mattel, Hasbro, Fisher Price, and other major toy companies, which uncovered hiring discrimination, excessive & illegal overtime, unpaid wages, poor living conditions, and more.
2015: CLW released a report which revealed several labor rights violations which still persist in Apple's Supplier factory, Pegatron. Violations included the use of hiring fees, inadequate pre-work safety training, presence of forced labor, long working hours and poor housing conditions.
2015: A follow up investigative report was released on HEG Technology, a company which supplies to mobile handset companies, including Samsung, Oppo, Huawei and TCL. The report revealed limited improvements with labor rights violations still prevalent. These include the use of underage and student workers, hiring discrimination, mandatory excessive overtime work hours and the lack of a labor union.
2015: A report was released which detailed labor conditions of five toy factories in China. The toy factories manufactured products for companies such as Hasbro, Mattel, Jakks Pacific and Disney. The report covered violations which included hiring discrimination, mandatory overtime hours, insufficient protect equipment, lack of labor unions and unpaid work.
2016: Report on investigations undergone at five cookware factories in China, which outlined numerous violations under Chinese Labor law. The factories manufactured for brands such as Walmart, Macy's, IKEA, Russell Hobbs, Stanley Rogers and Cuisinart among others. The investigation revealed several violations such as hiring discrimination, breach of contracts, excessive overtime work hours, lack of pay stubs and insufficient worker protection.

See also 

 China Labour Bulletin

Notes and references

External links 
 Official Site (English)
 中国劳工观察 (official site, Chinese)
 International Council of Toy Industries CARE Foundation Statement on China Labor Watch Report

Labor relations in China
Human rights in China
Labor rights groups
Organizations established in 2000
2000 establishments in the United States
Non-profit organizations based in New York (state)
501(c)(3) organizations